Articles on the Corporations, Municipalities and Taluks of Kerala may be found at:

Political divisions 
 
 Municipal corporations in Kerala 
 Municipalities of Kerala

Administrative divisions
 Taluks of Kerala
 Revenue Divisions of Kerala
 List of districts in Kerala

Kerala geography-related lists